Made in India may refer to:
 Made in India (album), a 1995 album by Alisha Chinai
BBC World's "Made in India" segments, including Mastermind India between 1998 and 2002
 Made in India (1996 TV series), a music programme on Channel V
 Made in India (2014 TV series), a Hindi-language inventions series on Epic
 "Made in India", a campaign used by Brand India

See also 
 Make in India
 India Inc.
 :Category:Industry in India
 Maid in India